Michel Dallaire (January 7, 1957 – April 25, 2017) was a Canadian novelist and poet. He was most noted for his novel Violoncelle pour une lune d'automne, which won the Trillium Book Award for French language children's literature and the Prix Christine-Dumitriu-Van-Saanen in 2015.

Born in Hawkesbury, Ontario, Dallaire grew up in the small mining town of Manitouwadge, Ontario where he attended primary and secondary school before moving to Sudbury in 1977 where he lived for the remainder of his life and career. In addition to poetry and fiction work, he also wrote songs that were performed by musicians including Stef Paquette, Chuck Labelle and Paul Demers.

Works

Fiction
L'oeil interrompu – 1985
Dans ma grande maison folle – 1995
L'enfant de tout à l'heure – 2000
Famien (sa voix dans le brouillard) – 2005
l'anarchie des innocences – 2007
Violoncelle pour lune d'automne – 2014

Poetry
Regards dans l'eau – 1981
Cinéma muet – 1990
Ponts brûlés et Appartenances – 1998
(le pays intime) – 1999
À l'écart du troupeau – 2003
l'écho des ombres – 2004
l'éternité derrière – 2008
pendant que l'Autre en moi t'écoute – 2010
dégainer – 2013
le souffle des dragons – 2016
nomadismes – 2016

References

1957 births
2017 deaths
20th-century Canadian novelists
20th-century Canadian poets
20th-century Canadian short story writers
20th-century Canadian male writers
21st-century Canadian novelists
21st-century Canadian poets
21st-century Canadian short story writers
21st-century Canadian male writers
Canadian male poets
Canadian male novelists
Canadian male short story writers
Canadian poets in French
Canadian novelists in French
Canadian short story writers in French
Franco-Ontarian people
People from Hawkesbury, Ontario
Writers from Greater Sudbury